Bioneers, under its parent foundation, Collective Heritage Institute, is a nonprofit organization based in New Mexico and California that promotes practical and innovative solutions to global environmental and bio-cultural challenges.  Founded in 1990 their philosophy recognizes and cultivates the value and wisdom of the natural world, emphasizing that responses to problems must be in harmony with the design of natural systems. Official Programs include Moonrise Women's Leadership, Restorative Food Systems, Indigeneity (Indigenous Forums,) Education for Action, and the award-winning Dreaming New Mexico community resilience program.

Bioneers produces innovative media covering subjects such as environmentalism, rights of nature, social justice, sustainability and permaculture. Bioneers Radio is broadcast on local radio stations across the U.S., as well as having segments featured on national NPR stations.

The organization also organizes the annual National Bioneers Conference, which is credited with inspiring a generation of leaders in sustainability. Conference presenters have included Michael Pollan, Andrew Weil, Gloria Steinem, Jane Goodall, Philippe Cousteau, Eve Ensler, Bill McKibben, Paul Hawken, and more. Plenary (Keynote) sessions from the national conference are also webcast to Beaming Bioneers satellite conferences held simultaneously in various locations throughout the United States and Canada.

Origin of name
Bioneer (root: "biological pioneer") is a neologism coined by founder Kenny Ausubel. It describes individuals and groups working in diverse disciplines who have crafted creative solutions to various environmental and socio-cultural problems rooted in shared core values, including whole systems, (anticipatory) thinking, a view of all life as interdependent, and sustainable mutual aid.

Annual conference
The first National Bioneers Conference, organized by Co-Founders Kenny Ausubel and Nina Simons, took place in 1990.  
For many years the conference took place annually in the fall in San Rafael, California.
In 2023, the Bioneers conference will move to  Berkeley, California and be held from April 6-8, 2023.

The national conference brings together a wide array of scientific and social innovators. Conference speakers come from interdisciplinary fields: environmental and socio-political activism; "green" biology, chemistry, design, architecture and urban planning; organic and "beyond organic" farming and gardening; indigenous perspectives; biodiversity, bioremediation, and wildland preservation; alternative energy; engaged spirituality, literature and the arts; holistic and "ecological" medicine; ethnobotany; socially responsible entrepreneurship, business and philanthropy; the environmental justice, women's and youth movements; independent media; etc.

In many cases the technological or social solutions to problems showcased are founded on emulation of natural self-organizing systems.

See also

Andy Lipkis
Ecovillage
Michael Pollan
Neologisms
Oceanographers
Water Keeper
Wild Green

References

External links 
Bioneers.org - site of the Bioneers | Collective Heritage Institute.
Read a blog by Founder Kenny Ausubel at Huffington Post

Environmental organizations based in the United States
Non-profit organizations based in New Mexico